Denair is a census-designated place (CDP) in Stanislaus County, California, United States. The population was 4,404 at the 2010 census, up from 3,446 at the 2000 census. It is part of the Modesto Metropolitan Statistical Area.

History

Denair was established in 1904, along the Santa Fe Railroad (once the Valley Division) tracks.
The town was renamed from Elmwood Colony to Denair in honor of a local landowner, John Denair.

Geography
Denair is located at  (37.527532, -120.799813).

Climate

Newman has a semi-arid climate with Mediterranean influences, characterized by hot, dry summers and cool winters.

Demographics

2010
At the 2010 census Denair had a population of 4,404. The racial makeup of Denair was 3,425 (77.8%) White, 25 (0.6%) African American, 55 (1.2%) Native American, 42 (1.0%) Asian, 4 (0.1%) Pacific Islander, 699 (15.9%) from other races, and 154 (3.5%) from two or more races. Hispanic or Latino of any race were 1,423 persons (32.3%).

The whole population lived in households, no one lived in non-institutionalized group quarters and no one was institutionalized.

There were 1,451 households, 611 (42.1%) had children under the age of 18 living in them, 913 (62.9%) were opposite-sex married couples living together, 168 (11.6%) had a female householder with no husband present, 86 (5.9%) had a male householder with no wife present.  There were 71 (4.9%) unmarried opposite-sex partnerships, and 10 (0.7%) same-sex married couples or partnerships. 221 households (15.2%) were one person and 113 (7.8%) had someone living alone who was 65 or older. The average household size was 3.04.  There were 1,167 families (80.4% of households); the average family size was 3.38.

The age distribution was 1,233 people (28.0%) under the age of 18, 407 people (9.2%) aged 18 to 24, 1,186 people (26.9%) aged 25 to 44, 1,098 people (24.9%) aged 45 to 64, and 480 people (10.9%) who were 65 or older.  The median age was 34.8 years. For every 100 females, there were 96.8 males.  For every 100 females age 18 and over, there were 94.3 males.

There were 1,523 housing units at an average density of 768.7 per square mile, of the occupied units 1,128 (77.7%) were owner-occupied and 323 (22.3%) were rented. The homeowner vacancy rate was 2.1%; the rental vacancy rate was 5.2%.  3,275 people (74.4% of the population) lived in owner-occupied housing units and 1,129 people (25.6%) lived in rental housing units.

2000
At the 2000 census there were 3,446 people, 1,131 households, and 907 families in the CDP. The racial makeup of the CDP was 78.61% White, 0.26% African American, 1.45% Native American, 0.23% Asian, 0.03% Pacific Islander, 15.35% from other races, and 4.06% from two or more races.  26.55% of the population were Hispanic or Latino of any race.
There were 1,131 households, 42.2% had children under the age of 18 living with them, 63.4% were married couples living together, 11.9% had a female householder with no husband present, and 19.8% were non-families. 15.4% of households were made up of individuals, and 6.6% had someone living alone who was 65 or older.  The average household size was 3.05 and the average family size was 3.41.

The age distribution was 29.7% under the age of 18, 9.3% from 18 to 24, 27.2% from 25 to 44, 24.1% from 45 to 64, and 9.7% who were 65 or older.  The median age was 34 years.  For every 100 females, there were 97.0 males.  For every 100 females age 18 and over, there were 97.0 males.

The median household income was $41,399 and the median family income was $46,538. Males had a median income of $38,598 versus $28,929 for females. The per capita income for the CDP was $15,278.  16.1% of the population and 11.1% of families were below the poverty line.  Out of the total population, 25.3% of those under the age of 18 and 3.0% of those 65 and older were living below the poverty line.

Controversy
On November 8, 2010 Denair Middle School asked a student to remove the American flag from the back of his bicycle citing Mexicans and fears for the students safety. Four days later, Denair School Superintendent, Edward Parraz overturned the decision again allowing the student to display the flag adding that the racial concerns would be discussed with the students involved and their parents.

Government

References

Census-designated places in Stanislaus County, California
Census-designated places in California
1904 establishments in California
Populated places established in 1904